Dmitry Davydov may refer to:
Dmitry Alexeyevich Davydov (born 1978), Russian footballer
Dmitri Anatolyevich Davydov (born 1975), Russian footballer
Dmitry Davydov (filmmaker), Russian film director